Krabi can refer to
the town Krabi in Thailand
the Krabi Province
Amphoe Mueang Krabi, the district around Krabi town
the Krabi River
Krabi Airport
Krabi Airline
an old Siamese sword, see Krabi (sword)
Krabi, Estonia, village in Rõuge Parish, Võru County, Estonia